Pavappettaval is a 1967 Indian Malayalam-language film, directed by P. A. Thomas. The film stars Sathyan, Kamaladevi, Sukumari and Adoor Bhasi. The film had musical score by B. A. Chidambaranath. It is a remake of the 1941 Telugu film Devatha.

Plot

Cast 

Sathyan as Gopi
Kamaladevi as Lakshmi
Sukumari
Adoor Bhasi
Hari
Muthukulam Raghavan Pillai as a marriage broker
O. Ramdas
Sreelatha Namboothiri as Padma
Aranmula Ponnamma as Bhavani Amma, mother of Gopi and Radha
C. I. Paul
Khadeeja
Kumari Rajam
Miss Kerala (Rani Chandra)
N. Govindankutty
S. P. Pillai as Pappu
Vidhubala as Radha, sister of Gopi

Soundtrack 
The music was composed by B. A. Chidambaranath with lyrics by P. Bhaskaran, Kedamangalam Sadanandan and M. K. R. Paattyath.

Reception 
The film was a critical and commercial failure; historian B. Vijayakumar believes this was due to its lack of "artistic and technical brilliance" and miscasting.

References

External links 
 

1960s Malayalam-language films
1967 films
Malayalam remakes of Telugu films